The War Memorial is a memorial obelisk in Floriana, Malta, which commemorates the dead of World War I and World War II. It was inaugurated on 11 November 1938 by Governor Charles Bonham-Carter to the memory of those killed in World War I, but in 1949 it was rededicated to those killed in both world wars. 

The monument was designed by Maltese artist Louis Naudi, who was influenced by Antonio Sciortino.

According to Mark G. Muscat, the War Memorial "is possibly the sole example of a work of art in Malta which up to a certain extent illustrates the idea of Futurism put forward by Marinetti and Sant'Elia in Italy... Naudi deserves credit for his successful attempt at breaking away from the British colonial architecture that was commonplace at the time... It would be more plausible to classify the War Memorial as an Art Deco stylistic expression... as an avant-garde aesthetic applied to hardstone construction, which gives Naudi's towering design an imposing look."

The monument is an obelisk in the form of a Latin cross, and it is built out of local globigerina limestone. It has four plaques showing the colonial badge of Malta and reproductions of a document issued by King George V in 1918 acknowledging Malta's role in World War I, the letter by which King George VI awarded the George Cross to Malta in 1942, and a 1943 scroll by President Franklin D. Roosevelt saluting Malta for its role in World War II.

The War Memorial is located on a site which was used for public executions when Malta was under Hospitaller rule. It is close to the Malta Memorial which is dedicated to Commonwealth aircrew who died in World War II, and memorials to the Royal Malta Artillery and The King's Own Malta Regiment. It was originally positioned halfway between City Gate and Ġlormu Cassar Avenue, but was relocated during the realigning of St. Anne Street in 1954. The memorial was restored and the area around it landscaped in the early 2010s. An eternal flame was installed at this point.

The President and Prime Minister as well as other dignitaries lay wreathes at the monument at an annual remembrance ceremony. The memorial is scheduled as a Grade 1 national monument.

Gallery

See also
Malta Memorial

Further reading
Galea, M. (2018, September 9). More wartime newspaper snippets from 1918. The Sunday Times of Malta, pp. 54-55.
 Remembering the future – the Floriana War Memorial, Greta Xuereb, Times of Malta, 24 November 2019

References

World War I memorials in Malta
World War II memorials in Malta
Floriana
Obelisks
Buildings and structures completed in 1938
Limestone buildings in Malta
Relocated buildings and structures
Roundabouts and traffic circles in Malta
1938 establishments in Malta